You might be looking for:
 The Yamas dialect of the Asmat language of West Papua
 the Yamasee language, an extinct language of the southeastern US
 Yimas language, a language of the Sepic area of Papua New Guinea
 Yeimas, one of the villages where the Gira language is spoken in the Madang province of Papua New Guinea